International Stasys Šimkus Choir Competition (Lithuanian: Tarptautinis Stasio Šimkaus chorų konkursas) is a international choir competition held every two years since 1976 in Klaipėda (Lithuania). Artistic director and organizer of the Choir Competition, president of Klaipėda Choirs' Association "Aukuras" – assoc. prof. Algirdas Šumskis.

References

Music festivals in Lithuania
Singing competitions 
Choral festivals
Music festivals established in 1976